The Merit 22 is an American trailerable sailboat that was designed by Paul Yates as a racer-cruiser and first built in 1981.

The Merit 22 is a development of the larger Merit 25 by the same designer.

Production
The design was built in the United States by Merit Marine, a company founded by the designer. The boat was built from 1981 until 1986, with 600 completed, but it is now out of production.

Design
The Merit 22 is a recreational keelboat, built predominantly of fiberglass. It has a masthead sloop rig, a raked stem, a plumb transom, a transom-hung rudder controlled by a tiller and a locking lifting keel. It displaces  and carries  of lead ballast. It has foam for positive flotation.

The boat is normally fitted with a small  outboard motor for docking and maneuvering.

The design has sleeping accommodation for five people, with a double "V"-berth in the bow cabin, a drop-down dinette table on the port side of the main cabin, that converts to a double berth, plus a quarter berth on the starboard side. The galley is located on the starboard side just forward of the companionway ladder. The galley is equipped with a two-burner stove and a sink, while an icebox doubles as the companionway step. The head is located in the bow cabin on the starboard side under the "V"-berth.

Operational history
In a 2010 review Steve Henkel wrote, "the Merit 22 (launched 1982), a racer-cruiser, followed the successful look-alike Merit 25 (launched 1979) which won the MORC national championships twice. Best features: She looks sleek, and although she suffers in the headroom department a little with the hatch closed, with her poptop erected, she is said to have six-foot headroom. Her vertically lifting keel is lead, not the usual iron, which improves her stability because of the greater density of lead, and avoids the maintenance chores associated with the rust that inevitably goes with iron or steel. The keel is out of the way in the up position and locks in the down position so it doesn't slide up in the event of a capsize. She has enough foam flotation to keep her from sinking, Worst features: Try as we might, we came up with only minor negatives. For example, her interior is very plain—designed for racing lightness rather than opulent luxury. Someone complained that her perforated aluminum rail (handy for attaching snatch blocks and fenders) was sharp enough on its top edge to chafe any docking lines that might pass over it. And one sailor suggested bigger mooring chocks and cleats than came standard."

See also
List of sailing boat types

References

External links
Photo of a Merit 22 on its trailer
Photo of a Merit 22 with pop-top open

Keelboats
1980s sailboat type designs
Sailing yachts
Trailer sailers
Sailboat type designs by Paul Yates
Sailboat types built by Merit Marine